Walter Gael Sandoval Contreras (born 5 November 1995) is a Mexican professional footballer who plays as a winger for Canadian Premier League side Vancouver FC.

Club career

Youth career
Sandoval played for many academies in the state of his native Jalisco, starting with Club Oro in 2010 and then settled with Estudiantes Tecos, until they were dissolved in 2012. Santos Laguna signed him to play for their under 17s shortly after. He went on trial with Roma in 2013, but was not signed.

Santos Laguna
In 2012, Sandoval moved to Santos Laguna. He made his Liga MX debut on July 17, 2016, against Tigres UANL coming in as substitute.

Loan at Juárez
Sandoval played on loan with Juárez in the Ascenso MX to gain professional playing experience.

Guadalajara
It was confirmed on November 18, 2017, that Sandoval will play for Guadalajara.

Mazatlán FC
In December 2020, Sandoval was loaned out to Mazatlán FC, wearing the squad number 1, a number typically used by goalkeepers.

Wellington Phoenix
In December 2021, Sandoval joined New Zealand A-League club Wellington Phoenix on loan until the end of the season.

Honours
Santos Laguna
Liga MX: Clausura 2015
Copa MX: Apertura 2014
Campeón de Campeones: 2015

Guadalajara
CONCACAF Champions League: 2018

Individual
Liga MX Best Rookie: 2016–17

References

External links
 

Liga MX players
Living people
1995 births
Mexican footballers
Footballers from Guadalajara, Jalisco
Tecos F.C. footballers
Santos Laguna footballers
C.D. Guadalajara footballers
FC Juárez footballers
Mazatlán F.C. footballers
Wellington Phoenix FC players
Association football wingers